The Theban Tomb TT17 is located in  Dra Abu el-Naga, part of the Theban Necropolis, on the west bank of the Nile, opposite to Luxor. It is the burial place of the ancient Egyptian noble named Nebamun, who lived during the 18th Dynasty, during the reign of Amenhotep II. Nebamun was a scribe and a physician to the King.

Nebamun was the son of Nebseny, a judge, and Amenhotep (?). His wife's name is not completely preserved but resembles Ta[..]nefer.

The tomb consists of a hall and an inner room. The hall is decorated with scenes of the deceased offering to his parents, and scenes from his life. Men are shown filling granaries, women are baking bread, etc.

In the inner room funerary scenes show a procession, rites before the mummy and offerings.

See also
 List of Theban tombs
 N. de Garis Davies, Nina and Norman de Garis Davies, Egyptologists

References

External links
Scans of Norman and Nina De Garis Davies' tracings of Theban Tomb 17 (external).

Buildings and structures completed in the 13th century BC
Theban tombs